Allogaster niger is a species of cerambycid from the Achrysonini tribe. They are mainly found in Nigeria

References 

Achrysonini